The Judy Jack Show was one of the earliest Australian television series, and is notable as one of the first children's series produced in that country. The series debuted in 1956 on Melbourne station HSV-7, and continued into 1957.

During the run of The Judy Jack Show, Judy Jack married journalist Trevor Dawson-Grove and took a fortnight off from presenting the series for her honeymoon.

See also
Fun Farm - First Australian-produced children's television series

References

External links

Seven Network original programming
1956 Australian television series debuts
1957 Australian television series endings
Black-and-white Australian television shows
English-language television shows
Australian children's television series
Australian live television series